The Lotha language is a Sino-Tibetan language spoken by approximately 180,000 people in Wokha district of west-central Nagaland, India. It is centered in the small district of Wokha (capital Wokha). This district has more than 114 villages such as Pangti, Maraju (Merapani), Englan, Baghty (Pakti) and others, where the language is widely spoken and studied.

Names 
Alternate names include Chizima, Choimi, Hlota, Kyong, Lhota, Lotha, Lutha, Miklai, Tsindir, and Tsontsii (Ethnologue).

Dialects 
Ethnologue lists the following dialects of Lotha.

Live
Tsontsü
Ndreng
Kyong
Kyo
Kyon
Kyou
In the Linguistic Survey of India, linguist George Abraham Grierson analyzed various branches of languages in India and categorized various Naga languages into three groups: Western Naga, Eastern Naga, and Central Naga.  Lotha falls into the Central Naga group, which also includes the languages Ao, Sangtam, and Yimkhiungrü.

Phonology

Consonants 

 /v/ when followed by /o/ can also be heard as [w] in free variation.
 The pronunciation of the trills /r, rʰ/ may vary as approximants [ɹ, ɹʰ] or a retroflex fricative [ʐ] among speakers.
/j/ only occurs as phonemically aspirated as /jʰ/ among other dialects.
Plosives /p, k/ can be heard as unreleased [p̚, k̚] in word-final position.

Vowels 

 When /u/ follows a labial consonant or /k, kʰ/, the consonant is then affricated and /u/ is realized as unrounded [ɯ]. The result is then from /ku, kʰu, pu, pʰu/ to [kvɯ, kfɯ, pvɯ, pfɯ].
/i/ may also tend to centralize and lower as [ɨ, ə] in open syllables when following sibilant sounds (/ʃi/ ~ [ʃɨ~ʃə]).
 /ə/ may also range in pronunciation to a back sound [ɯ].
/i, u/ can also be heard shortened as [ɪ, ʊ] within the first syllable.

Orthography and literature 
Lotha is written in the Latin script, introduced by the British and American missionaries in the late 19th century. It is a medium of education up to the post-graduate level in the state of Nagaland. It is also the language in which the church sermons are preached. The Bible has been translated into the Lotha language, adding significantly to its vocabulary, which had an influence of Assamese and Hindi.

References

External links 
 Translation of the beginning of the Book of Genesis in Lotha.
 Sino-Tibetan Languages
 Endangered Languages Project: Lotha Naga

Ao languages
Languages of Nagaland
Endangered languages of India